Braces in mathematical equations {} may refer to:
 Precedence of operators
 Sets